Lekhetho Rakuoane (born 20 May 1960) is the Minister of Law and Justice of Lesotho. He previously served as the Minister of Tourism, Environment and Culture and Minister of Home Affairs.

Background and education 
Rakuoane was born in 1960 and he is from Mosotho in Lesotho. He got his high school certificate in Holy Names High School. He bagged his bachelor's degree in Law from the National University of Lesotho.

Career 
Rakuoane had a position in the National Assembly as the Deputy Speaker. He is also the Head of the Popular Front for Democracy.

References 

Living people
1960 births
National University of Lesotho alumni